Oliva is a Spanish, Portuguese, Italian, and Czech surname meaning "olive".

Notable people with the surname include
 Achille Bonito Oliva (born 1939), Italian art critic
 Aythami Artiles Oliva (born 1986), Spanish footballer
 Carlos Oliva (born 1979), Honduran footballer
 Criss Oliva (1963–1993), American guitarist
 Edel Oliva (born 1965), Cuban race walker
 Erneido Oliva (born 1932), Cuban-American army general
 Fernan Perez de Oliva (c.1492–c.1530), Spanish writer
 Giovanni Paolo Oliva (1600–1681), Italian Jesuit priest
 Christian Oliva (born 1996), Uruguayan footballer 
 Ignazio Oliva (17th century), Italian painter
 Isabel Flores de Oliva (1586–1617), Spanish-Peruvian saint
 Jared Oliva (born 1995), American baseball player
 Jay Oliva, American storyboard artist
 Jon Oliva (born 1960), American singer
 José Oliva (1971–1997), Dominican baseball player
 Juan Manuel Oliva (born 1960), Mexican politician
 L. Jay Oliva (1933–2014), American university president
 Mariana Díaz Oliva (born 1976), Argentine tennis player
 Mauricio Oliva (born 1951), Honduran politician
 Maximiliano Oliva (born 1990), Argentine footballer
 Patrizio Oliva (born 1959), Italian boxer
 Peter Oliva (born 1964), Canadian novelist
 Sergio Oliva (1941–2012), Cuban bodybuilder
 Tony Oliva (born 1938), Cuban baseball player
 Vicente Pascual Oliva (died 1848), Spanish Franciscan missionary
 Viktor Oliva (1861–1928), Czech painter

Fictional characters
 Biscuit Oliva, a character from Baki the Grappler

Spanish-language surnames
Portuguese-language surnames
Italian-language surnames